Buhara is a village in the Hassa District, Hatay Province, Turkey. The village had a population of 1,078 in 2022.

References

Villages in Hassa District